Jordanville Public Library is a historic community library building in Jordanville, Herkimer County, New York. Built in 1907–1908, it is a one-story, gable-roofed structure with clapboard siding that features an entrance portico with four Tuscan order columns. It was designed by New York City architects Trowbridge & Livingston in the Classical Revival style.

It was listed on the National Register of Historic Places in 1984.

References

External links
Jordanville Public Library

Library buildings completed in 1907
Libraries on the National Register of Historic Places in New York (state)
Neoclassical architecture in New York (state)
Buildings and structures in Herkimer County, New York
National Register of Historic Places in Herkimer County, New York